Anagallis is a genus of about 20–25 species of flowering plants in the family Primulaceae, commonly called pimpernel. The scarlet pimpernel referred to in literature is part of this genus.

These are annual or perennial plants, growing in tufts on weedy and uncultivated areas. The stems are prostrate or decumbent. The leaves are opposite, rarely whorled, and sometimes with a few alternate leaves at the end of the stem. They are usually ovate in shape with a cordate base. Some of the species produce flowers of various colors. The flowers are radially symmetrical and have 5 sepals. The corolla consists of a short tube and 5 lobes. The tube may be so short that the lobes appear to be separate petals. They are usually solitary in the leaf axils, but sometimes are on short spikes at the end of the stem. Pimpernel flowers remain open only under direct sun-light. The stamens are opposite the corolla lobes. The staminal filaments have conspicuous hairs. The ovary is superior, globose, and circumscissile near the middle.

They were traditionally classified as members of the primrose family (Primulaceae), but a genetic and morphological study by  et al. showed that they belonged to the closely related family Myrsinaceae. In the APG III system, published in 2009, Primulaceae is expanded to include Myrsinaceae, thus Anagallis is back in Primulaceae again.

Another study by Ulrika Manns and Arne A. Anderberg (2005), based on molecular phylogeny, states that Anagallis in its present circumscription is paraphyletic and should also include in its clade the small genera Asterolinon and Pelletiera, as well as two Lysimachia species (Lysimachia nemorum and Lysimachia serpyllifolia).

Species 
Anagallis acuminata - (Angola)
Anagallis alternifolia - (Chile)
Anagallis arvensis - Scarlet pimpernel, red pimpernel (Europe; syn. *A. parviflora, A. platyphylla, A. phoenicea)
Anagallis barbata - (Brazil)
Anagallis brevipes - (Tanzania)
Anagallis crassifolia  - (Spain, Morocco)
Anagallis djalonis  - (tropical Africa)
Anagallis filiformis - (Brazil)
Anagallis foemina - Blue pimpernel (Europe; syn. Anagallis caerulea)
Anagallis gracilipes - (Zimbabwe)
Anagallis hexamera - (Ethiopia, Kenya)
Anagallis kingaensis  - (tropical Africa)
Anagallis minima - Chaffweed (Europe, a cosmopolitan weed whose native status outside Europe is unclear; syn. A. centunculus, previously Centunculus minimus)
Anagallis monelli - Flaxleaf pimpernel (Mediterranean; syn. A. linifolia)
Anagallis nummulariifolia - (Madagascar)
Anagallis oligantha  - (Malawi)
Anagallis peploides - (Madagascar)
Anagallis pumila - Florida pimpernel (Americas)
Anagallis rubricaulis - (Madagascar)
Anagallis schliebenii  - (Tanzania)
Anagallis serpens - (eastern Africa)
Anagallis tenella - Bog pimpernel (Europe; syn. A. repens )
Anagallis tenuicaulis - (Madagascar)
Anagallis tsaratananae  - (Madagascar)

References

 
Primulaceae genera